Folegandros (also Pholegandros) is a small Greek island in the Aegean Sea that, together with Sikinos, Ios, Anafi and Santorini, forms the southern part of the Cyclades.
It has three small villages, Chora, Karavostasis, and Ano Meria, which are connected by a paved road. Folegandros is part of the Thira regional unit.

Mythology
According to Greek mythology, it was said to have derived its name from a son of Minos.

History 
Little is known about the ancient history of Folegandros. Its inhabitants were Dorians. Later it came under Athenian rule. The island contained a polis (city-state) called Pholegandros, which was sited at the modern Chora and a member of the Delian League where it appears on Athenian tribute lists between 425/4 and 416/15 BCE. The island was called the iron Pholegandros by Aratus on account of its ruggedness, and is also noted by ancient geographers Strabo and Ptolemy, who calls it Pholekandros.

The island was conquered in 1207 by the Venetian Marco Sanudo and remained under the rule of Venice until 1566, when it was taken by the Ottoman Turks. The Greeks reclaimed it in the 19th century during the Greek war of independence. During the 20th century it has been used as a place of exile for political prisoners, especially during the 4th of August regime.

Geography
Folegandros' landscape is varied, and includes tall cliffs and a large cave. The "capital" of the island, Chora, is built on the edge of a 200-metre high cliff. The port of Folegandros is the small village of Karavostasis. The Ano Meria village contains a small but interesting Ecological and Folklore Museum. Among the notable beaches on Folegandros is Katergo, accessible only by foot or by boat from Karavostasis. Katergo beach is used by naturists.

Gallery

References

External links
Municipality of Folegandros 
Beaches in Folegandros 

Islands of Greece
Cyclades
Municipalities of the South Aegean
Populated places in Thira (regional unit)
Landforms of Thira (regional unit)
Islands of the South Aegean
Members of the Delian League
Locations in Greek mythology
Populated places in the ancient Aegean islands